Detour is a 2009 Norwegian horror/thriller film written and directed by Severin Eskeland, starring Marte Germaine Christensen and Sondre Krogtoft Larsen.

Plot
When a Norwegian couple are instructed by a policeman to take a detour through the Swedish forests, a series of strange and horrifying events follow.

Reviews
In the Norwegian press, the film got "die throws" of 4 in VG, in Dagsavisen, in Aftenposten, in Bergens Tidende and in Romerikes Blad; 3 in Dagbladet, in Stavanger Aftenblad, in Fædrelandsvennen and in iTromsø; and 2 in Klassekampen and in Adresseavisen. Filming took place in Finnskogen and the film premiered in Elverum, Hamar and Kongsvinger before everywhere else. In the local newspapers around here, the film received "die throws" of 4 in Hamar Arbeiderblad in Glåmdalen and in Østlendingen.

References

External links
 

2009 horror films
2009 films
Norwegian slasher films
2000s Norwegian-language films